The 1979 NCAA Division I Golf Championship was the 41st annual NCAA-sanctioned golf tournament to determine the individual and team national champions of men's collegiate golf at the University Division level in the United States.

The tournament was held at the Bermuda Run Country Club in Winston-Salem, North Carolina, hosted by Wake Forest University.

Ohio State won the team championship, the Buckeyes' second NCAA title and first since 1945.

Gary Hallberg, from Wake Forest, won the individual title.

For the first time, teams needed to be in the top fifteen after three rounds of play to qualify for the fourth and final championship round; all other team were cut.

Individual results

Individual champion
 Gary Hallberg, Wake Forest

Team results

DC = Defending champions
 Missed cut: LSU, Temple, Florida State, Georgia, NC State, Texas, Weber State, Texas A&M, Auburn, Wichita State, San Diego State, Indiana, Connecticut
Debut appearance

References

NCAA Men's Golf Championship
Golf in North Carolina
NCAA Golf Championship
NCAA Golf Championship
NCAA Golf Championship